Cessna Skywagon may refer to:

Cessna 180 Skywagon
Cessna 185 Skywagon
Cessna 206 (also 205 and 207), known variously as the Super Skywagon, Skywagon, Stationair, and Super Skylane